There have been 309 ethnic Chinese in the Dewan Rakyat since the establishment of the Parliament of Malaysia. As of 2018, there are 48 representatives, or 21.62% of the body.

Ethnic Chinese together with Malays, Indians and other ethnics in Malaysia have had the right to both vote and sit in parliament since 1959 and all states and territories have been represented by an ethnic Chinese in the Dewan Rakyat. Although ethnic Chinese make up near a quarter of the population, ethnic Chinese are mainly concentrated in urban areas and the parliamentary seat rate is relatively low comparing to other ethnics.

List of members of Chinese descent
This is a complete list of ethnic Chinese who have served as members of the Dewan Rakyat, ordered by seniority. This list includes ethnic Chinese who served in the past and who continue to serve in the present.

Number of ethnic Chinese in the Dewan Rakyat

References

Parliament of Malaysia